HBO Family is a Southeast Asian pay television channel owned by HBO Asia. It features children's programming, comedy, family and drama films.

Programming

Info Programming
HBO Family Asia has licensing deals with two major Hollywood conglomerates film studios: Warner Bros. Discovery (Warner Bros. Pictures; New Line Cinema, HBO Films, Castle Rock Entertainment; Warner Independent Pictures) and Paramount Global (Paramount Pictures, Paramount Vantage).

Current Programming
Adventure Time
Crashbox
Hollywood on Set
Saving My Tomorrow
Space Nova
The New Adventures of Lassie
Zoom the White Dolphin

Former Programming
Johnny Test
Majority Rules!
Supernormal
The Wannabes
The Next Step
Connor Undercover
Heroes: Legend of the Battle Disks
Teenage Fairytale Dropouts
Time Warp Trio
Captain Biceps
Darcy's Wild Life
H2O: Just Add Water
Mako Mermaids
Grojband
Paper Port
A Little Curious
Kindergarten
Classical Baby
Fraggle Rock
Ben 10 (2016)
We Bare Bears
 Steven Universe
The Looney Tunes Show
The Tom and Jerry Show
Batman: The Brave and the Bold
Ben 10
The Not-Too-Late Show with Elmo
Justice League

External links
 Official website

Family
Television stations in Singapore
Movie channels in the Philippines
Television channels and stations established in 2005
Home Box Office, Inc.
HBO Family